Jenno Topping is an American film producer. Films she has produced include  Dr. Dolittle (1998), Charlie's Angels (2000), St. Vincent (2014), Miss Peregrine's Home for Peculiar Children (2016) and Hidden Figures (2016), which earned her an Academy Award for Best Picture nomination with Donna Gigliotti, Peter Chernin, Pharrell Williams, and Theodore Melfi, and again in 2020 at the 92nd Academy Awards for the 2019 film Ford v Ferrari, along with Chernin and James Mangold.

Filmography
She was a producer in all films unless otherwise noted.

Film

As an actress

Location management

Thanks

Television

Awards
2019: Best Picture (for Ford v Ferrari, Nominated)
2019: Producers Guild of America Award for Best Theatrical Motion Picture (for Ford v Ferrari, Nominated)
2016: Best Picture (for Hidden Figures, Nominated)
 2016: Producers Guild of America Award for Best Theatrical Motion Picture (for Hidden Figures, Nominated)

References

External links
 

Living people
American producers
American filmmakers
Year of birth missing (living people)